El Pino is a large bunya pine located on the southeastern corner of Folsom Street and N. Indiana Street in East Los Angeles, California. The tree overlooks the Wellington Heights neighborhood of East Los Angeles and the Boyle Heights neighborhood of the city of Los Angeles from atop a small hill.

History
The tree, a mature bunya pine, grows on the former property of Dr. Okuno, a Japanese dentist and intern in a World War II concentration camp. Following release, Dr. Okuno received the land as a gift from an Anglo lady with whom his wife worked. There he rebuilt his business and amassed a huge library. After retiring, he took long strolls around East Los Angeles, greeting everyone and amusing the children with storytelling. Dr. Okuno is listed in the California Who's Who.

On Día de los Inocentes in December 2020, an online rumor spread that a real estate developer was planning to fell the tree as part of a new housing development. Although the rumour was false, it sparked outrage among the locals enough for them to petition the city to "save El Pino from being cut down". Art Gastelum, a local resident who owns the property on which the tree stands, reassured locals that he has no intentions to develop the property.

East Los Angeles landmark
The people of East Los Angeles consider the tree a living monument of the area's multifaceted ethnic background. The area is known for having the highest proportion of Hispanic Americans out of any city or census-designated place in the United States outside of Puerto Rico.

In recent years, the tree has also become a symbol of community resistance to the gentrification of their neighborhood.

In popular culture
The El Pino is extensively featured in the 1993 Taylor Hackford movie Blood In Blood Out.

See also
Encino Oak Tree
Old Survivor

References 

Individual pine trees
Individual trees in California
Landmarks in Los Angeles
Natural history of Los Angeles County, California
Boyle Heights, Los Angeles
Eastside Los Angeles